Belu is a UK beverage company. The company supplies mineral water, tonic water, a range of flavoured mixers and filtration systems.

History
Belu was founded in 2004 by film maker Reed Paget as a bottled water business with an aim to be an environmentally friendly alternative to other beverages on the market. Before launching Belu, Paget was a keen environmentalist in business communities, encouraging others in the drinks industry to consider the environmental impact of sourcing, manufacturing and packaging. Early stage investors in Belu included Body Shop co-founder Gordon Roddick, environmentalist Ben Goldsmith and hedge fund manager, Chris Cooper-Hohn.

Paget launched the UK's first compostable plastic bottle in 2006.

Paget appointed Karen Lynch, previously Barclays Branch Marketing Manager, as a new MD in 2010. Lynch expanded the company distribution model to include wholesale and in 2011 she re-launched the Belu brand 

In 2011, Lynch employed the design agency.

This is Real Art to create a new bottle design as part of the brand refresh.

In March 2020, Lynch stepped down as CEO and was replaced by Natalie Campbell MBE. Later in 2020. Charlotte Harrington became Co-CEO.

Belu partnered with Ocean Bottle and launched a reusable bottle in October 2020. Ocean Bottle partners with Plastic Bank, which works with collectors in coastal communities with high levels of plastic pollution. Every Belu Ocean Bottle sold funds the collection of 11.4kg of plastic, equivalent to stopping 1000 bottles from entering our oceans.

In 2021, Belu launched a range of flavoured mixers and tonic waters. During the same year, it launched its first overseas filtration operations in Hong Kong.

Belu has given £5.2 million of its profits to WaterAid since 2011. Belu has a partnership with WaterAid and has an agreement in place to give 100% of its profits to WaterAid. In 2012, Belu was part of the arc initiative. It is also a member of Social Enterprise UK.

References

External links
 Official website

Bottled water brands